Surhuri is a Chuvash heathen holiday, and a name designated to Christmas celebrations in areas where traditional paganism was replaced by Christianity.

Surhuri is celebrated in winter.

The word Surhuri (Upper Chuvash people pronounce it as "Sorhori" ) means "a sheep leg". Similarly pagans of the Cheremis people celebrate and call this holiday Shorok yol "a sheep leg".

In Ulhash Chuvash pagans celebrate Surhuri on January 6. According to V.K. Magnitskiy, earlier Chuvash people celebrated it at the end of December, on the third Friday after Nikola Day (December 6 ). It approximately coincides with Russian Christmas.

South Chuvash people still differentiate between Russian Christmas and Surhuri.

Surhuri is celebrated according to the ancient customs with sacrifices and prayers corresponding to them. And this holiday consists of continuous festivities, pranks and jokes.

So as North Chuvashs Cheremis people celebrate it on Friday before or after Russian Christmas.

According to the description of V.K. Magnitskiy, earlier boys and girls came in the houses and gathered groats and bins, saying the words:

Me-e-e, let sheep have lambs,
Let girls remain virgins,
Let women give birth to babies.

Literature 

 Skvortsov M. I., "Культура чувашского края" (The culture of Chuvash people), Cheboksary, 1995, .

External links
 Сурхури на Чувашском культурном портале
 ТРАДИЦИИ , ОБРЯДЫ , ПРАЗДНИКИ
 НОВОГОДНИЙ ПРАЗДНИК СУРХУРИ
 Сценарии праздников -Сурхури
 Хыпарсем: Сурхури
 Сурхури - YouTube
 Сурхури, сурхури...
 Тюменские чуваши отпразднуют сурхури
 Сурхури юррисем - Чӑваш юррисем, юмахӗсем, халапӗсем
 Новогодний праздник сурхури
 Сурхури–праздник надежды на будущее
 Весело отметили «Сурхури» | Советская Чувашия
 Сурхури сӑрипе сӑйланма пухӑнчӗҫ
 Самара встретила чувашский новогодний праздник «Сурхури»
 Самара встретила чувашский новогодний праздник «Сурхури»
 Фольклорный праздник "Сурхури" в Чубаевском сельском доме культуры

Observances in Russia
Chuvashia
Turkic mythology
Religion in Chuvashia
Winter events in Russia